Danny Philip (born 5 August 1953) is a politician and diplomat from Solomon Islands. He was Prime Minister of Solomon Islands from 2010 to 2011. Previously he served as Minister of Foreign Affairs from 1995 to 1996 and again from July 2000 to June 2001. He was the leader of the People's Progressive Party from 1997 to 2000, then founded the Reform Democratic Party, of which he was the leader when elected Prime Minister.

Personal life
Danny Philip was born on 5 August 1953. His mother, who suffered from poliomyelitis, died just two days after his birth.

Philip has been an English teacher and linguist by profession. He is from the town of Lokuru, which is located on Rendova Island, Western Province. Philip is married to his current wife, Margaret Philip. He has two former wives from previous marriages.

Political career
Philip previously served four terms in the National Parliament of Solomon Islands between 1984 and 2001. He represented the Vona Vona-Rendova-Tetepare constituency from 1984 until 1993. Philip was then elected as the MP from the South New Georgia-Rendova-Tetepare constuency from 1994 until 2001.

Philip served as the Solomon Islands' Foreign Minister for two tenures, 1995 to 1996 and again from July 2000 to June 2001.

Philip is currently the Member of Parliament representing South New Georgia-Rendova-Tetepare as of 2019.

Prime Minister of the Solomon Islands
Philip was narrowly elected the Prime Minister of the Solomon Islands on 24 August 2010, following the 2010 general election. Philip and his supporters, who constituted the so-called "Pacific Casino camp," narrowly defeated Steve Abana, the leader of the Solomon Islands Democratic Party, by just three votes: Philip received 26 votes while Abana garnered 23. He replaced caretaker Prime Minister Derek Sikua.

In a victory speech following the Prime Minister election, Philip stated that his first priority would be to form a new government. He said his government would actively support the country's Constitutional Reform process. This had been one of his central campaign pledges, and reason for creating the Reform Democratic Party.   
  
Upon naming his Cabinet, he appointed Manasseh Maelanga as his deputy.

On 11 November 2011, after the defection of five ministers and seven backbenchers to the Opposition, Philip resigned rather than face a motion of no confidence. He led an interim government until Parliament elected a new Prime Minister on 16 November. Gordon Darcy Lilo, a member of Philip's National Coalition for Reform and Advancement, was elected as his successor on 16 November.

Philip elected to remain in parliament as a backbencher after leaving the Prime Minister's office.

References

External links
Solomon Star: Philip lays bare policies on major issues
Solomon Islands Prime Ministerial contenders named from RNZI
PM Philip Hails New Zealand's Assistance Programs
Solomons PM Danny Philip resigns – report

1953 births
Foreign Ministers of the Solomon Islands
Living people
People from the Western Province (Solomon Islands)
People's Progressive Party (Solomon Islands) politicians
Prime Ministers of the Solomon Islands
Solomon Islands diplomats
Solomon Islands educators
Members of the National Parliament of the Solomon Islands
Victoria University of Wellington alumni
Forestry ministers of the Solomon Islands